Sura Bayoru Yekka (born January 4, 1997) is a Canadian professional soccer player who plays as a right-back for Swedish club Vittsjö GIK in the Damallsvenskan and the Canada national team.

Early life
Yekka began playing soccer at age six with North Mississauga SC. later playing with Brams United. She played for Team Ontario at the 2013 Canada Summer Games, where she was named a tournament all-star. Yekka also excelled in track and field, winning the bronze medal in the 800m at the 2010 U-16 Track and Field National Championships.

College career
In 2015, she began attending the University of Michigan, where she played for the women's soccer team. She made her collegiate debut on August 21, 2015 against the Eastern Michigan Eagles and recorded her first career start and first career assist in a 3-0 victory on August 30 against the Detroit Mercy Titans. She was named to the Big Ten All-Freshman team for her debut season. She redshirted the 2016 season season, due to her national team commitments. Yekka scored her first collegiate goal on October 6, 2019 against the Nebraska Cornhuskers.

Club career
In September 2020, Yekka joined German club MSV Duisburg of the Frauen-Bundesliga.

In 2021, she joined Le Havre AC in the French Division 2 Féminine. In her first season, she helped them win promotion to the Division 1 Féminine.

In February 2023, she joined Swedish club Vittsjö GIK in the Damallsvenskan on a two-year contract.

International career
In December 2012, she made her debut in the Canadian youth program, attending a camp with the Canada U15 team. After attending a couple of more youth camps with the Canada U17 and Canada U20, Yekka was called up to the senior in October 2013, making her senior debut at age sixteen on October 30 against South Korea, without having played in any youth level games before. She earned her second senior cap on November 24 against Mexico, earning rave reviews for her performance in a 0-0 draw. She was named the 2013 Canadian U17 Player of the Year.

After having already made multiple appearances for the senior team in 2013 and early 2014, Yekka made her debut for the youth teams in 2014 appearing in both the 2014 FIFA U-17 Women's World Cup and 2014 FIFA U-20 Women's World Cup. She scored her first international goal on December 6, 2015, scoring the winning goal against Jamaica U20 at the 2015 CONCACAF Women's U-20 Championship. In 2015, Yekka was nominated for the Canadian U20 Player of the Year Award. She also played for the U20s in the 2016 FIFA U-20 Women's World Cup.

Personal
Yekka is the daughter of Evelyn Adiru, a track and field athlete who specialized in the 800m and 1500, who represented Uganda at the 1984 Summer Olympics.

References

External links

 
 

1997 births
Living people
Canadian people of Ugandan descent
Canadian sportspeople of African descent
Canadian women's soccer players
Canada women's international soccer players
Michigan Wolverines women's soccer players
MSV Duisburg (women) players
Soccer players from Toronto
Women's association football fullbacks
Black Canadian women's soccer players
Canadian expatriate women's soccer players
Expatriate women's soccer players in the United States
Expatriate women's footballers in Germany
Canadian expatriate sportspeople in the United States
Canadian expatriate sportspeople in Germany
North Mississauga SC (women) players
Vittsjö GIK players